Tatyana Zhuravlyova (born 19 December 1967) is a retired Russian heptathlete.

She finished eighth at the 1991 World Championships and tenth at the 1993 World Championships.

External links

1967 births
Living people
Russian heptathletes
Soviet heptathletes
Place of birth missing (living people)
20th-century Russian people